This is a list of what are intended to be the notable top hotels by country, five or four star hotels, notable skyscraper landmarks or historic hotels which are covered in multiple reliable publications. It should not be a directory of every hotel in every country:

Bangladesh
InterContinental Dhaka
Dhaka Westin
Pan Pacific Sonargaon, Dhaka
Hotel Agrabad, Chittagong
 Sayeman Beach Resort

Bahamas

Atlantis Paradise Island 
British Colonial Hilton Nassau	
The Cove Atlantis 	
Grand Central Hotel 	
Graycliff 	 	
Regatta Point 	 
Xanadu Beach Resort & Marina

Barbados
The Crane, Saint Philip
Fairmont Royal Pavilion, Saint James
Sandy Lane, Holetown

Belgium
 Hotel Astoria, Brussels
 Hotel Metropole, Brussels

Belize
Chaa Creek, near Benque Viejo
Pook's Hill Lodge
San Ignacio Resort Hotel, San Ignacio Town

Benin
 Benin Marina, Cotonou

Bermuda

9 Beaches, Sandys Parish
Elbow Beach, Paget Parish
The Fairmont Hamilton Princess, Hamilton
Hamilton Hotel (defunct), Hamilton
The Reefs, Southampton

Bhutan
 Hotel Jumolhari, Thimphu
 Hotel Motithang, Thimphu
 Hotel Wangchuck, Thimphu
 Taj Tashi, Thimphu

Bolivia
Palacio de Sal, Salar de Uyuni

Bonaire
Divi Flamingo Beach Resort & Casino
Plaza Resort Bonaire

Brazil
Ariau Towers
Belmond Hotel das Cataratas
Centro Empresarial Nações Unidas
Dom Pedro Hotels & Golf Collection
Grande Hotel de Goiânia
Kubitschek Plaza
Palácio Quitandinha
Plaza São Rafael Hotel

São Paulo
Hotel Unique

Rio De Janeiro
Astoria Palace Hotel
Copacabana Palace
Copacabana Hotel Residência
Hotel Glória
Hilton Rio de Janeiro Copacabana
Hotel Nacional Rio
Hotel Atlantico Praia
LSH Hotel
Marina All Suites Hotel
Rio Othon Palace
Sheraton Grand Rio Hotel & Resort

British Virgin Islands	
Bitter End Yacht Club

Bulgaria

Burgas
Hotel Bulgaria Burgas
Hotel Mirage Burgas

Golden Sands
Hotel Admiral Golden Sands
Melia Grand Hermitage

Plovdiv
Maritsa Hotel
Novotel Plovdiv

Sofia
Grand Hotel Sofia
Hotel Marinela Sofia
Hotel Rodina
Kempinski Hotel Zografski
Princess Hotel Sofia

Sunny Beach
Grand Hotel Sunny Beach
Hotel Burgas Beach
Kuban Resort and Aquapark

Varna
Interhotel Cherno More

Burma
 Andaman Club, Thahtay Kyun Island
 Governor's Residence, Yangon
Grand Park Hotel, Mandalay
Kandawgyi Palace Hotel, Yangon
 Strand Hotel, Yangon

B